Valiabad (also Romanized as Valīābād) is a village in Howmeh Rural District, in the Central District of Behbahan County, Khuzestan Province, Iran. At the 2006 census, its population was 29, in 6 families.

References 

Populated places in Behbahan County